Madison Heights is a city in Oakland County in the U.S. state of Michigan. As of the 2010 census, its population was 29,694.

History 
Originally part of Royal Oak Township, Madison Heights incorporated as a city by popular vote on January 17, 1955, and chartered on December 6 of that same year, becoming the tenth city government in southern Oakland County. At that time, the  city was one of the largest suburban communities in the Metro Detroit area. The first city hall was at 26305 John R Road, the former township offices. On April 5, 1963, a new municipal building was dedicated which is on the present location at 300 West Thirteen Mile Road. The city lies in the Interstate 696 (I-696) and I-75 corridor and is served by two primary school districts, Lamphere and Madison, as well as a full-service municipal government. 

The mayor of Madison Heights is Roslyn Grafstein, who was appointed as Mayor in August 2020 to fill a vacant seat.

Geography 

Although 91% of the buildings in Madison Heights are single-family homes or condominiums (approximately 9,800 residential property owners), 60% of the tax base is fueled by light industrial or commercial property. The city has 15 voting precincts, totaling more than 21,000 registered voters. Robert Earl Richardson was the first Chief of Police when the city was chartered in December 1955.

Madison Heights shares borders with Troy to the north, Royal Oak to the west, Hazel Park to the south, and Warren to the east. The eastern border of Madison Heights (Dequindre Road) is also the border between Oakland and Macomb counties.

Interstate 75 passes north to south on the west side of the city, and Interstate 696 is the major feature of its southern border. The junction of these two highways is shared with Royal Oak and Hazel Park on the southwest corner of Madison Heights.

Demographics

2010 census
As of the census of 2010, there were 29,694 people, 12,712 households, and 7,543 families residing in the city. The racial makeup of the city was 83.9% White, 6.4% African American, 0.5% Native American, 5.8% Asian, 0.1% Pacific Islander, 0.7% from other races, and 2.7% from two or more races. Hispanic or Latino of any race were 2.5% of the population.

There were 12,712 households, of which 27.5% had children under the age of 18 living with them, 41.0% were married couples living together, 12.9% had a female householder with no husband present, 5.4% had a male householder with no wife present, and 40.7% were non-families. 34.1% of all households were made up of individuals, and 11.8% had someone living alone who was 65 years of age or older. The average household size was 2.32 and the average family size was 3.02.

The median age in the city was 38.3 years. 20.4% of residents were under the age of 18; 8.7% were between the ages of 18 and 24; 30.4% were from 25 to 44; 26.6% were from 45 to 64; and 13.9% were 65 years of age or older. The gender makeup of the city was 49.1% male and 50.9% female.

2000 census
As of the census of 2000, there were 31,101 people, 13,299 households, and 8,005 families residing in the city. The city's racial makeup was 89.60% White, 1.82% African American, 0.44% Native American, 4.97% Asian, 0.03% Pacific Islander, 0.46% from other races, and 2.68% from two or more races. Hispanic or Latino of any race were 1.61% of the population.

There were 13,299 households, of which 26.9% had children under the age of 18 living with them, 45.2% were married couples living together, 10.5% had a female householder with no husband present, and 39.8% were non-families. 33.8% of all households were made up of individuals, and 12.3% had someone living alone who was 65 years of age or older. The average household size was 2.33 and the average family size was 3.02.

In the city, the population was spread out, with 22.1% under the age of 18, 8.1% from 18 to 24, 35.4% from 25 to 44, 20.2% from 45 to 64, and 14.2% who were 65 years of age or older. The median age was 36 years. For every 100 females, there were 95.8 males. For every 100 females age 18 and over, there were 92.9 males.

The city's median household income was $42,326, and the median family income was $51,364. Males had a median income of $41,478 versus $29,345 for females. The city's per capita income was $21,429. About 7.0% of families and 8.9% of the population were below the poverty line, including 10.8% of those under age 18 and 13.0% of those age 65 or over.

Asian community

According to data from the U.S. Census Bureau, in 2008 1.9% of people in Madison Heights were of Vietnamese descent. About 0.2% of all people in Michigan and about 0.2% of people in Oakland County are of Vietnamese descent, making the Madison Heights figures ten times the state average. There are several Vietnamese businesses, including markets, restaurants, and specialty shops, along Dequindre and John R in Madison Heights. The area along John R caters to a pan-Asian clientele, with businesses oriented to other ethnicities present alongside Vietnamese ones. 168 Asian Mart (168亚洲超市), a  supermarket, is the largest Asian supermarket in southeast Michigan, and one of the largest in the state.

Madison Heights also has a sizeable community of Chinese descent. The Chinese Cultural Center (CCC) is in Madison Heights.

Economy
Madison Heights is part of Oakland County's Automation Alley. There are more than 1,300 commercial and industrial businesses and services within the city's , and the city has a majority of small businesses, as well as more than 100 major companies within its borders, such as Best Buy, Coca-Cola, Commercial Steel Treating Corporation, Costco, CVS Pharmacy, Henkel Technologies, Home Depot, Meijer, Micro Center, Ogura Corporation, Sam's Club, Hungry Howie's, Target, UPS, WOW!, Culver's, and Sears.

The Hungry Howie's Pizza corporate headquarters is in Madison Heights. Madison Heights is also home to Moosejaw.

The Telway Hamburger System is a long-standing 24-hour restaurant in Madison Heights known for its sliders (small hamburgers) and its unique late-night crowds.

Education
Madison District Public Schools and Lamphere Public Schools have public schools serving Madison Heights.

Madison Heights is also home to Bishop Foley Catholic High School, a private school.

Four Corners Montessori Academy is a public charter school also in Madison Heights.

The Japhet School was in Madison Heights until 2013, when it moved to Clawson. St. Vincent Ferrer School of the Roman Catholic Archdiocese of Detroit was in Madison Heights.

Notable people

Monte Geralds, Michigan legislator
George Steele, wrestler
Robert Wyland, muralist

References

External links

City of Madison Heights

 
Cities in Oakland County, Michigan
Metro Detroit
1955 establishments in Michigan
Populated places established in 1955
Little Saigons